Miss Thailand World 2016 was the 27th edition of the Miss Thailand World auditioned on April 21-April 24, 2016. Pageant held at Grand Hyatt Erawan Hotel in Bangkok on 28 May 2016. Thunyachanok Moonnilta from Chiang Mai crowned her successor at the end of the event.

The coronation pageant was broadcast live on Channel 3 Thailand. The crowned winner was Jinnita Buddee of Chiang Rai, who later represented Thailand at the Miss World 2016 competition in the Washington, D.C., United States and finished in the top 20.

Final results

Special Award

Fast Track

People's Choice

Contestants

Notes
Jinnita Buddee, Miss Thailand World 2016, placed in the Top 20 at Miss World 2016 held on December 18, 2016 at the MGM National Harbor in Washington, D.C., United States.
 Patlada Kulphakthanapat, appointed as Miss Thailand World 2017 after the 2017 edition of the pageant was cancelled as a mark of respect on account of the death of the Thai Monarch, King Bhumibol Adulyadej, and she competed in Miss World 2017 held on November 18, 2017 at the Sanya City Arena in Sanya, China where she was unplaced.
 Chanya Wonglappanich, Top 5 Miss Thailand World 2016,  placed in the Top 10 at Miss Chinese International Pageant 2017 during the finals held on January 15, 2017 at Arena of Stars, Resorts World Genting, Pahang, Malaysia

See also
 Miss World 2016
 Miss Universe Thailand 2016

References

External links
 

Beauty pageants in Thailand
2016 beauty pageants
2016 Thai television seasons
Miss Thailand World